Regular Joe is the second studio album by American country music artist Joe Diffie. Released in 1992, it features the singles "Is It Cold in Here", "Ships That Don't Come In", "Next Thing Smokin'", and "Startin' Over Blues". All of these except for "Startin' Over Blues" reached Top 20 on the Hot Country Songs charts. Of the album's ten tracks, Diffie co-wrote four of them, including its most successful single: "Is It Cold in Here". The album itself has been certified gold by the RIAA. The track "Goodnight Sweetheart" was recorded by David Kersh on his 1996 debut album.

Track listing

Personnel
Mike Chapman - bass guitar
Joe Diffie - lead vocals, background vocals
Jerry Douglas - Dobro
Paul Franklin - steel guitar
Vince Gill - background vocals
Rob Hajacos - fiddle
Bill Hullett - acoustic guitar
Brent Mason - electric guitar
Tim Mensy - acoustic guitar
Dave Pomeroy - bass guitar
Lonnie Wilson - drums, background vocals

Chart performance

References

1992 albums
Joe Diffie albums
Epic Records albums
Albums produced by Bob Montgomery (songwriter)